

452001–452100 

|-bgcolor=#f2f2f2
| colspan=4 align=center | 
|}

452101–452200 

|-bgcolor=#f2f2f2
| colspan=4 align=center | 
|}

452201–452300 

|-bgcolor=#f2f2f2
| colspan=4 align=center | 
|}

452301–452400 

|-id=307
| 452307 Manawydan ||  || Manawydan fab Llŷr, a scholar, magician and peaceful man in Welsh mythology || 
|}

452401–452500 

|-bgcolor=#f2f2f2
| colspan=4 align=center | 
|}

452501–452600 

|-bgcolor=#f2f2f2
| colspan=4 align=center | 
|}

452601–452700 

|-bgcolor=#f2f2f2
| colspan=4 align=center | 
|}

452701–452800 

|-bgcolor=#f2f2f2
| colspan=4 align=center | 
|}

452801–452900 

|-bgcolor=#f2f2f2
| colspan=4 align=center | 
|}

452901–453000 

|-bgcolor=#f2f2f2
| colspan=4 align=center | 
|}

References 

452001-453000